Nightly is an alternative pop band from Nashville, Tennessee, consisting of Jonathan Capeci and Joey Beretta, formerly of Dinner And A Suit and Nicholas Sainato. The band is currently independent and managed by Neon Coast

History
Cousins Jonathan Capeci and Joey Beretta grew up together around Philadelphia, Pennsylvania. Throughout their childhood and teenage years, they played in a number of bands together, but as they reached college, they dropped out and relocated to Nashville to pursue their project at the time, Dinner And A Suit. As that project dissolved, Capeci and Beretta regrouped with friends Stephen Cunsolo and Nicholas Sainato to form Nightly. The project lacked momentum until they signed with Interscope Records in July 2016 and began work on their debut EP.

After the release of the leading single, "XO" on May 10, Nightly's first EP, titled Honest, was released on October 21, 2016. The EP contained 4 songs, with "XO" being the most successful. Spotify featured "XO" on multiple playlists throughout the Summer, which skyrocketed it to over 2 million plays in a matter of weeks. Following the success of "XO, "Talk To Me" was the next promoted single from the EP.

On March 6, 2017, Nightly released their first music video for the track "XO" off of their debut EP. They collaborated on the video with Tobias Nathan and Jake Saner. Capeci said that they picked Nathan specifically for the video due to his grasp on color. They worked with Nathan again on their music video for "Talk To Me", which released on Youtube on June 27th, 2017.

The band toured extensively throughout the end of 2016 and beginning of 2017, opening for acts like Ke$ha, The All-American Rejects, Zella Day, and K.Flay. After being featured at the We Found New Music showcase at SXSW, they embarked on their first headline tour in April 2017, with support from Saint Mesa, the project of singer and songwriter Danny McCook. They finished out their year of touring with bands such as Urban Cone, The Struts, and The Night Game, while also playing at Bonnaroo for the first time.

On January 22, 2018, Nightly was announced as support for NF on his USA tour. They performed on 28 dates of this tour. While on tour, Nightly released their single "Miss You Like Hell" on February 16. Soon followed up by their single "Holding On", released on March 22.

In August 2019, the band announced that they had signed a new record deal with BMG. In the notes app screenshots they shared on social media, they also explained how challenging the past year was and that they needed to postpone their upcoming tour.

Nightly released their debut album, Night, Love You, on October 16, 2020.

Discography and Additional Works

References

External links
 
 www.Neon-coast.com

Indie pop groups from Tennessee
Musical groups from Nashville, Tennessee
Musical groups established in 2016
2016 establishments in Tennessee